Asiavision may refer to:

 Asiavision (news exchange)
 Asia-Pacific Song Contest
 Urban Vision (known as Asia Vision)
 Asia Vision (TV network)